The wicket-keeper in the sport of cricket is the player on the fielding side who stands behind the wicket or stumps being guarded by the batsman currently on strike. The wicket-keeper is the only member of the fielding side permitted to wear gloves and external leg guards. The West Indies cricket team, who were granted Test status in 1928, have fielded numerous wicket-keepers. A chronological list of West Indian Test wicket-keepers is shown here.

The following specialist keepers have filled the role for the West Indies in Test cricket since 1928, with Jeff Dujon's 272 dismissals from 81 Test matches making him the most prolific. Shane Dowrich is the incumbent keeper. From Deryck Murray in 1963 onwards, most keepers have also kept wicket for the West Indies in at least one One-Day International.

Footnotes

Notes

See also
 West Indies Test wicket-keepers
 List of West Indies Test cricketers

West Indies wicket-keepers
West Indies wicket
West Indies
Wicket-keepers